Club Africain is a Tunisian football club based in Tunis that competes in the Tunisian Championship. It fields several sports teams, including football, handball, basketball, swimming and volleyball. The football team was the first Tunisian club to win an international trophy, when they won the Maghreb Cup Winners Cup in 1971. Twenty years later, in 1991, Club Africain became the first Tunisian team to win the African Champions League.

Honours

National competitions
 Tunisian League (13) 
 Champions: 1947, 1948, 1964, 1967, 1973, 1974, 1979, 1980, 1990, 1992, 1996, 2008, 2015

 Tunisian Cup (13)
 Winners: 1965, 1967, 1968, 1969, 1970, 1972, 1973, 1976, 1992, 1998, 2000, 2017, 2018

 Tunisian Super Cup (3)
 Winners: 1968, 1970, 1979

Continental competitions
 African Cup of Champions Clubs (1)
 Winners: 1991–92

Worldwide competitions
 Afro-Asian Club Championship (1)
 Winners: 1991–92

Regional competitions
 Arab Cup Winners' Cup (1)
 Winners: 1995

 Arab Champions League (1)
 Winners: 1997

 North African Cup of Champions: 2
 Winners: 2008, 2010

Maghreb Cup Winners Cup (1)
 Winners: 1971

 Maghreb Champions Cup (3)
 Winners: 1974, 1975, 1976

Crest and colours

Kit manufacturers and shirt sponsors

Players

The squad list includes only the principal nationality of each player;

Current squad
As of 15 November 2021.

Managers

Presidents

Rival clubs
  ES Tunis (Tunis Derby)
  Étoile Sportive du Sahel (Rivalry)
  CS Sfax (Rivalry)
  Stade Tunisien (Derby)
  MC Alger (Rivalry)
  CS Constantine (Rivalry)

See also
Club Africain (handball)
Club Africain (basketball)

References

External links
 

Club Africain on Instagram

 
Football clubs in Tunisia
Football clubs in Tunis
Association football clubs established in 1920
Multi-sport clubs in Tunisia
Club Africain
CAF Champions League winning clubs